Georges Philippar (16 October 1883 – 10 February 1959) was a French shipbuilder. He joined the Messageries Maritimes company in 1912, becoming its chief executive officer in 1925.

The ill-fated French ocean liner MS Georges Philippar was named after him. The ship caught fire on her maiden voyage in 1932 and sank in the Gulf of Aden with the loss of 54 lives.

Biography 
Georges Philippar was born in Fontenay-aux-Roses, he son of Edmond Anatole Philippar, director of the École nationale d'agriculture de Grignon. He married Marguerite Céline Jeanne Bonnet on 5 January 1907. 

He founded the Société Provençale de Constructions Aéronautiques, an offshoot of SPCN (Société Provençale de Construction Navale), in 1925.

He died in Paris on 10 February 1959.

See also
Société Provençale de Constructions Aéronautiques

References 

1883 births
1959 deaths
Shipbuilders
French chief executives
French company founders